Siegmund Nimsgern (born 14 January 1940) is a German bass-baritone, born in Sankt Wendel, Saarland, Germany.

After leaving school in 1960 he studied singing and musical education at the Hochschule für Musik Saar with Sibylle Fuchs, Jakob Stämpfli and Paul Lohmann.

He made his debut at the Saarländisches Staatstheater in Saarbrücken in 1967. In 1971, he went to the Deutsche Oper am Rhein in Düsseldorf and Duisburg. From there he began his international career as an opera singer.

He sang at La Scala in Milan, at Covent Garden in London, at the Metropolitan Opera in New York, and at the Vienna State Opera.

In the years 1983 to 1987, he sang Wotan at the Bayreuth Festival under Georg Solti, Peter Schneider and Peter Hall in The Ring of the Nibelung.

He has recorded numerous operas including Der Vampyr, Schwanda the Bagpiper, Martha, Hansel and Gretel, La serva padrona, Parsifal, a 1989 Grammy Award-winning recording of Lohengrin, and a 1982 Grammy Award-winning recording of Der Ring Des Nibelung.

He lives with his family in Sankt Ingbert, Saarland, Germany. His son is the musical theatre composer Frank Nimsgern.

See also
 Hänsel und Gretel (John Pritchard recording)

References

External links
Bach cantatas
Interview with Siegmund Nimsgern, November 8, 1982

1940 births
Living people
People from Sankt Wendel (district)
German bass-baritones
German opera singers
Hochschule für Musik Saar alumni